Charles Storrar Gough (21 May 1939 – 3 April 2015) was a Scottish professional footballer who played four league games in England for Charlton Athletic in the 1964–65 season. Gough also played for Alton Town in England and Highlands Park in South Africa. He served in the Parachute Regiment of the British Army. He died on 3 April 2015, aged 75. His son is fellow player Richard Gough.

References

2015 deaths
Scottish footballers
Charlton Athletic F.C. players
Alton F.C. players
Highlands Park F.C. players
English Football League players
Association football wing halves
Scottish expatriate footballers
Scottish expatriate sportspeople in South Africa
Expatriate soccer players in South Africa
1939 births
Footballers from Glasgow
20th-century British Army personnel
British Parachute Regiment soldiers